Dendropogonella is a genus of mosses (Bryophyta) with only one known species, Dendropogonella rufescens. It is found in South America (Brazil, Costa Rica, Guatemala, Mexico, Venezuela).

References

External links
 

Monotypic moss genera
Hypnales
Flora of South America